St. John's College in Cleveland, Ohio, originally known as Sisters' College, was a school for teachers and nurses established in 1928 by the Roman Catholic Diocese of Cleveland. In fall 1974, enrollment included 619 women and 51 men. The school closed in 1975. The facilities were then merged with the adjacent St. John's Cathedral.

A school of the same name in Cleveland was founded by Bishop Louis Rappe in 1854.

Notable alumni include Judy Robson, Majority Leader of the Wisconsin State Senate (2007-), Michael Pennock (1945-2009), Catholic author.

References

Universities and colleges in Cleveland
Defunct Catholic universities and colleges in the United States
Defunct private universities and colleges in Ohio
Nursing schools in Ohio
Educational institutions established in 1928
1975 disestablishments in Ohio
Catholic universities and colleges in Ohio
1928 establishments in Ohio
Roman Catholic Diocese of Cleveland